is a Japanese football player currently playing for FC Machida Zelvia in the J2 League.

Club statistics
Updated to 1 January 2020.

1Includes Suruga Bank Championship and Promotion Playoffs to J1.

References

External links
Profile at Machida Zelvia

Profile at Oita Trinita 

1989 births
Living people
Association football people from Ōita Prefecture
Japanese footballers
J1 League players
J2 League players
Oita Trinita players
V-Varen Nagasaki players
FC Machida Zelvia players
Association football midfielders